State Route 170 was a state route in the U.S. state of Washington. It was an auxiliary route of SR 17. It started at SR 17 in Mesa, then headed west to Ringold, where it ended.

Route description
From 1964 until 1970, SR 170 began at Ringold Road near the Columbia River southwest of Basin City.

History

The former route of SR 170 first appeared on a map in 1926, when Rand McNally published a road map of Washington, including a road extending from Hanford to Mesa. In 1953, SSH 11A was relocated due to the development of the Hanford Site and the Hanford–Mesa route became the Ringold branch. Although the roadway was on a map by 1926, the road wasn't finished until after 1963; one year later in 1964, the highway became SR 170, which was later moved to another route near Warden in 1970.

Major intersections

References

170